Oscar Leeser (born May 7, 1958) is an American politician who has served as the 52nd mayor of El Paso, Texas since 2021. A member of the Democratic Party, he previously served as the 50th mayor from 2013 to 2017.

Early life and education
Leeser graduated from Coronado High School in El Paso.

Career

Business and philanthropy 
Following graduation from high school, Leeser began his career in the auto industry, working with several dealerships in El Paso for over three decades. Leeser was given a career opportunity in 2001, when he became president and dealer operator of Hyundai of El Paso. He had turned a local store that was only selling 15 cars a month into the number one overall dealer in El Paso. His store also became the number one Hyundai dealer in the South Central Region and ninth in the United States for Hyundai dealers.

Mayor of El Paso

Leeser served as El Paso mayor from 2013 to 2017, and then took a break from public life due to health issues.

2020 election
Lesser was a candidate for mayor again in the 2020 election. He received the largest share of the vote in the November general election, and was elected to a second term after defeating Margo in the December runoff election.

Electoral history

References

External links

|-

1958 births
21st-century American politicians
American automobile salespeople
American politicians of Mexican descent
Businesspeople from El Paso, Texas
Hispanic and Latino American mayors in Texas
Hyundai people
Living people
Mayors of El Paso, Texas
Mexican emigrants to the United States
Politicians from Chihuahua (state)
Texas Democrats
20th-century American businesspeople
21st-century American businesspeople